Alis Boçi (born 8 February 1991) is an Albanian footballer who plays as a defender for KS Kastrioti in the Albanian First Division.

Career
He was previously with Vllaznia Shkodër. He signed a permanent one year contract with Luftetari Gjirokaster on 19 June 2012.

References

External links

1991 births
Living people
Footballers from Shkodër
Albanian footballers
Albania under-21 international footballers
Association football midfielders
KF Vllaznia Shkodër players
KS Ada Velipojë players
Luftëtari Gjirokastër players
KF Teuta Durrës players
Besëlidhja Lezhë players
FC Kamza players
KS Kastrioti players
Kategoria e Parë players
Kategoria Superiore players